The 1996 BellSouth Open was a tennis tournament held on outdoor hard courts at the ASB Tennis Centre in Auckland in New Zealand and was part of the World Series of the 1996 ATP Tour. It was the 29th edition of the tournament and was held from 8 January through 14 January 1996. Eighth-seeded Jiří Novák won the singles title.

Finals

Singles

 Jiří Novák defeated  Brett Steven 6–4, 6–4
 It was Novák's 1st title of the year and the 3rd of his career.

Doubles

 Marcos Ondruska /  Jack Waite defeated  Jonas Björkman /  Brett Steven by walkover
 It was Ondruska's 1st title of the year and the 3rd of his career. It was Waite's 1st title of the year and the 2nd of his career.

References

External links
 
 ATP – tournament profile
 ITF – tournament edition details

BellSouth Open
ATP Auckland Open
Bellsouth Open
January 1996 sports events in New Zealand